The Hale & Kilburn company of Philadelphia was a furniture manufacturing company founded by Warren Hale and Cheney Kilburn.  The Hale & Kilburn company's primary business was the production of railroad car seats for the greatly expanding American railroad companies.

History

Founding
Hale, Kilburn, & Co. was organized in 1867 by Warren Hale, Cheney Kilburn, two of Hale's sons and Artemus Kilburn, brother of Cheney Kilburn. It was incorporated as the Hale & Kilburn Manufacturing Company in 1876 with Cheney Kilburn serving as its first president and Warren Hale serving as vice president. Warren Hale's son, Henry S. Hale, became president after him.

J.P. Morgan & Co.
The Hale & Kilburn company was sold to J.P. Morgan & Co. in 1911 for $9 million.

American Motor Body Company
The Hale & Kilburn company was reorganized in 1920 as the American Motor Body Company, a corporation founded by the American Can Company to merge Hale & Kilburn and the Wadsworth Manufacturing Company (Detroit, Michigan). In 1923, Charles M. Schwab purchased the American Motor Body Company. On September 4, 1925, Walter Chrysler announced the Chrysler Corporation's purchase of the Detroit plant of the American Motor Body Corporation. In 1926, the American Motor Body Corporation and its Safeway Six-Wheel subsidiary were sold to the American Car and Foundry Company.

References

American railway entrepreneurs
Manufacturing companies based in Philadelphia
Railway service companies of the United States